Youth Runs Wild is a 1944 B movie directed by Mark Robson and starring Bonita Granville, Kent Smith, Jean Brooks, Glen Vernon and Vanessa Brown. The plot concerns inattentive parents and juvenile delinquency. The film was produced by Val Lewton. It was written by John Fante, Herbert Kline and Ardel Wray. Although Val Lewton produced the film, the final released version was so different from the original cut that he asked for his name to be removed from the picture; a request denied him by RKO.

Plot summary

Cast 
 Bonita Granville as Toddy
 Kent Smith as Danny Coates
 Jean Brooks as Mary Hauser Coates
 Glen Vernon as Frank Hauser
 Vanessa Brown as Sarah Taylor
 Ben Bard as Mr. Taylor
 Mary Servoss as Mrs. Cora Hauser
 Lawrence Tierney as Larry Duncan
 Johnny Walsh as Herb Vigero
 Rod Rodgers as Rocky
 Elizabeth Russell as Mrs. Mabel Taylor
 Stanley Blystone as Policeman (uncredited)
 Art Smith as Fred Hauser (uncredited)

Production 
Edward Dmytryk, who had recently directed the sensationalistic films Hitler's Children and Behind the Rising Sun (both in 1943), was initially set to direct Youth Runs Wild – which at various time had the working titles "The Dangerous Age", "Look to Your Children" and "Are These Our Children?" – but he left to direct Tender Comrade.  The film went into production under director Mark Robson, a regular in the Val Lewton unit, from November 3 to December 21, 1943.  For the shoot, the cinematographer, John J. Mescall, experimented with a new "swivel lens" that would allow a nearly infinite depth of focus.

The film was inspired by a photo essay that appeared in Look magazine on September 21, 1943.  Look, however, did not like the completed film, describing it as an "outworn, stale documentary", and they refused to promote the film in the magazine, or even to allow their name to be used in the film's credits.  Some copies of the film do carry on the main title card (see the image in the infobox at the head of this article) the legend:

The film's technical advisor, Ruth Clifton, was a teenager whose example of starting a youth recreation center in Moline, Illinois, inspired others around the country to do the same thing. RKO attempted to position the film as authentic by showing it to various state and local authorities concerned with juvenile delinquency, but they also did not receive the film well, even though one of the writers, Herbert Kline was a noted director of documentaries about social issues. The studio's efforts did bring the film to the attention of the U.S. State Department, which expressed concern that focusing on juvenile delinquency at that moment might have a detrimental effect on national morale.

Lewton argued that the intent of the film was to draw attention to a national problem and help bring about measures to solve it, which would do the country more good than harm. ... RKO decided not to pull the film from active production, but because of its controversial subject matter, Lewton was given more supervision than usual, much to his displeasure.

RKO tested two versions of the film, Lewton's and another in which several scenes had been cut, including one where an abused teenager killed his sadistic father. The final released version was the studio's cut. As a result, some of the actors listed in the credits do not actually appear in the film. Lewton later disavowed the final version of the film and attempted to have his name removed from it.

Youth Runs Wild was premiered in New York City on September 1, 1944 and went into general release in January 1945. It was not well received and lost $45,000.

References

External links 
 
 
 
 

1944 films
American black-and-white films
American drama films
1940s English-language films
Films directed by Mark Robson
Films produced by Val Lewton
Films set on the home front during World War II
1944 drama films
Films scored by Paul Sawtell
RKO Pictures films
1940s American films